The 1982 South Carolina gubernatorial election was held on November 2, 1982 to select the governor of the state of South Carolina. The state constitution was amended by the voters on November 4, 1980 to allow for the governor to serve a second consecutive four-year term. Governor Richard Riley, the popular Democratic incumbent, easily defeated Republican W. D. Workman, Jr. and became the first governor since Thomas Gordon McLeod in 1924 to be elected to a second consecutive term. , this was also the last election that a Democrat has carried every county in South Carolina.

Democratic primary
Governor Richard Riley faced no opposition from South Carolina Democrats and avoided a primary election.

Republican primary
The South Carolina Republican Party held their primary for governor in the summer of 1982. The lack of a Democratic primary for Governor gave the Republicans an opportunity to increase interest in their party, but the popularity of Governor Richard Riley prevented many additional voters from participating in the primary. W. D. Workman, Jr. decisively defeated Roddy T. Martin and earned the right to face Riley in the general election.

General election
The general election was held on November 2, 1982 and Richard Riley was elected as the next governor of South Carolina. Turnout decreased from the previous gubernatorial election because of the uncompetitive nature of the race. Riley won every County in the state.

 
 

|-
| 
| colspan=5 |Democratic hold
|-

See also
Governor of South Carolina
List of governors of South Carolina
South Carolina gubernatorial elections

External links
SCIway Biography of Governor Richard Wilson Riley

Gubernatorial
1982
1982 United States gubernatorial elections